Show Ground Halt railway station was on the Cork, Blackrock and Passage Railway in County Cork, Ireland.

History

The station opened in 1880.

It was closed in August 1932.

Routes

Further reading

References

Disused railway stations in County Cork
Railway stations opened in 1880
Railway stations closed in 1932